Drążno may refer to the following places in Poland:

Drążno, Kuyavian-Pomeranian Voivodeship
Drążno, Masovian Voivodeship
Drążno-Holendry